Enrique Aguilar Zermeño (born 1 November 1969) is a Mexican wrestler. He competed in the 1996 Summer Olympics. Later, he worked as a wrestling coach and was considered one of the best Mexican wrestlers of all time.

References

External links
 

1969 births
Living people
Wrestlers at the 1996 Summer Olympics
Mexican male sport wrestlers
Olympic wrestlers of Mexico
Pan American Games medalists in wrestling
Pan American Games silver medalists for Mexico
Wrestlers at the 1995 Pan American Games
20th-century Mexican people
21st-century Mexican people